Derek Foster may refer to:

 Derek Foster (rugby league), rugby league footballer for Castleford
 Derek Foster (cricketer) (1907–1980), English cricketer
 Derek Foster, Baron Foster of Bishop Auckland (1937–2019), British Member of Parliament